Marcus Adams (born 30 June 1993) is an Australian rules footballer playing for the Brisbane Lions in the Australian Football League (AFL).

He was drafted with the 35th selection in the 2015 national draft by the Western Bulldogs.

AFL career
Adams made his debut in round 1, 2016 against Fremantle. He played a further 10 games in his debut season, before a foot injury sustained in the round 15 clash against Sydney cut short his year.

Adams made his first appearance in 2017 in the round 2 grand final rematch against the Swans, as a direct replacement for injured veteran Dale Morris. He was among the best players, recording 20 disposals, 9 of which were contested.

Statistics
Updated to the end of the 2022 season.

|-
| 2016 ||  || 33
| 11 || 0 || 2 || 95 || 84 || 179 || 63 || 25 || 0.0 || 0.2 || 8.6 || 7.6 || 16.3 || 5.7 || 2.3 || 0
|-
| 2017 ||  || 25
| 10 || 4 || 7 || 86 || 68 || 154 || 65 || 30 || 0.4 || 0.7 || 8.6 || 6.8 || 15.4 || 6.5 || 3.0 || 0
|-
| 2018 ||  || 25
| 6 || 0 || 0 || 55 || 35 || 90 || 37 || 12 || 0.0 || 0.0 || 9.2 || 5.8 || 15.0 || 6.2 || 2.0 || 2
|-
| 2019 ||  || 24
| 10 || 0 || 0 || 74 || 31 || 105 || 51 || 12 || 0.0 || 0.0 || 7.4 || 3.1 || 10.5 || 5.1 || 1.2 || 0
|-
| 2020 ||  || 24
| 1 || 0 || 0 || 2 || 3 || 5 || 1 || 0 || 0.0 || 0.0 || 2.0 || 3.0 || 5.0 || 1.0 || 0.0 || 0
|-
| 2021 ||  || 24
| 17 || 0 || 0 || 166 || 71 || 237 || 92 || 30 || 0.0 || 0.0 || 9.6 || 4.6 || 14.2 || 5.4 || 1.5 || 0
|-
| 2022 ||  || 24
| 18 || 1 || 0 || 177 || 56 || 233 || 104 || 24 || 0.1 || 0.0 || 9.8 || 3.1 || 12.9 || 5.8 || 1.3 || 0
|- class=sortbottom
! colspan=3 | Career
! 73 !! 5 !! 9 !! 655 !! 348 !! 1003 !! 413 !! 133 !! 0.1 !! 0.1 !! 9.0 !! 4.8 !! 13.7 !! 5.7 !! 1.8 !! 2
|}

Notes

References

External links

 https://www.wafl.com.au/player/marcus-adams

Living people
1993 births
Australian rules footballers from Western Australia
Western Bulldogs players
West Perth Football Club players
Swan Districts Football Club players
Brisbane Lions players